Bab Ksiba is a gate in Marrakech, Morocco. Bab Ksiba and another more famous gate further north, Bab Agnaou, served as entrances to the royal Kasbah (citadel) in the southern part of the medina of Marrakech, a UNESCO World Heritage Site.

Historical background 
The name Ksiba, (pronounced Lak- siba), in Berber refers to the Kasbah district of the Medina, where this gateway is located. Kasbah means "fortress" and ksiba (or qusayba) means literally "Little-Fort".

The Kasbah of Marrakesh, built by the Almohad sultan Yaqub al-Mansour, is the site of the El Mansouria Mosque, the El Badi Palace and the Saadian Tombs. Bab Ksiba was the entrance to another small kasbah (ksiba or qusayba) which was adjoined to the southwestern corner of the main kasbah in order to protect the western side of the Grand Mechouar (a vast open square, still present today, at the entrance of the royal palace) and the Derb Chtouka neighbourhood. The date of its construction is unclear; it existed at the beginning of the 19th century and may have been built under Muhammad ibn Abdallah in the 18th century, but was almost certainly not part of the original Almohad kasbah.

See also
Walls of Marrakesh

Notes

References
Deverdun, Gaston (1959). Marrakech: Des origines à 1912. Rabat: Éditions Techniques Nord-Africaines.

External links
Image of Bab Ksiba by Maverickhawkesley:

Buildings and structures completed in the 12th century
Berber architecture
Gates of Marrakesh